Bernadette Tobin  (born 1946) is an Australian Catholic ethicist and professor of philosophy. She is the daughter of political activist and journalist B.A. Santamaria.

Education 
Tobin was educated at Genazzano College, Kew and received her undergraduate degree from the University of Melbourne in 1968. She also completed a Masters of Education (1977) and a Master of Arts (1983) at the same institution.

Tobin completed her doctoral degree at Cambridge University in politics.

Career 
Tobin began her career as a teacher. She taught philosophy at Mercy Teachers' College, Melbourne and English at Tottenham Technical School.

Tobin is a founding director of The Plunkett Centre. The centre was established in 1992 as a joint venture between St Vincent's Hospital and the Australian Catholic University. Tobin was appointed a Senior Lecturer in Philosophy at the Australian Catholic University in 1996. She held this position until 2002.

Tobin is an honorary member of the medical faculty at the University of New South Wales and the University of Sydney through the Clinical School at St Vincent's and the Children's Hospital, Westmead respectively. She has been a featured speaker at the Wheeler Centre speaking about faith, religion and spirituality.

Tobin has served on the Australian Health Ethics Committee and the Garvan Medical Research Institute ethics committee. As chair of the St John's College, University of Sydney council between 2013 and 2020, she oversaw protracted negotiations that led to the new St John's College Act 2018. In 2017, Tobin was appointed as a life member of the Pontifical Academy.

Tobin is married to Terence Tobin QC, who is a former Chancellor of the University of Notre Dame Australia. As close friends of Cardinal Pell, the Tobins visited him frequently in prison and assisted with his communication with lawyers.

Awards 
In the 2016 Queen's Birthday Honours, Tobin was made an Officer of the Order of Australia for her work in bioethics, and public advisory and research councils.

In 2018, Tobin was made a Dame Grand Cross of the Order of St. Gregory the Great, alongside her husband Terence Tobin. The papal award was for her service in ethics and education.

Publications 
 

 
 Guest editor (with Steve Matthews) of Theoretical Medicine and Bioethics (2016)
 Is it justifiable to compel     performance by a doctor in violation of conscience? Australasian     Catholic Record, January 2019
 Female Genital Mutilation and the role of health-care practitioners (with David Isaacs), Journal of     Paediatrics and Child Health, 53, 2017
 Human vulnerability in medical contexts (with Steve Matthews). Theoretical Medicine and Bioethics,     37, 2016.
 When doctors and parents disagree. Journal of Paediatrics and Child Health, 50, 2014.
 Religious Perspectives on Umbilical Cord Blood Banking (with Jordens, C et al.) Journal of Law and     Medicine, 19; 2012.
 Spinal muscular atrophy: do the benefits of ventilation compensate for its burdens? (with Gray, K; Isaacs, D; Kilham, H;) Journal of Paediatrics and Child Health, 49, 2013.

References 

Living people
1946 births
Australian ethicists
Australian philosophers
Australian women academics
Australian Roman Catholics
Officers of the Order of Australia
University of Melbourne alumni
Alumni of the University of Cambridge
Dames Grand Cross of the Order of St Gregory the Great
Academic staff of the Australian Catholic University
People educated at Genazzano FCJ College